The Lola LC90 was a Formula One car designed by Eric Broadley and Chris Murphy for use in the 1990 Formula One season by the Larrousse team. It was powered by the 3.5L Lamborghini LE3512 V12 engine. The car was driven by Japanese driver Aguri Suzuki who had spent  failing to pre-qualify all 16 races for Zakspeed, and Frenchman Éric Bernard.

Race history
The LC90 made its debut at the 1990 San Marino Grand Prix replacing the updated 1989 car, the LC89B used in the opening two rounds of the season. After most of the major runners had dropped out of the race (both McLaren-Hondas and Ferraris), Suzuki finished a brilliant and highly popular third at his home Grand Prix behind the Benetton-Fords of Nelson Piquet and Roberto Moreno. Suzuki even finished in front of the Renault V10 powered Williams pair of Riccardo Patrese and Thierry Boutsen. In fact, with two Brazilians and a Japanese driver finishing in the top 3, the Japanese Grand Prix was the last time (as of ) that no European driver has finished on the podium for a Formula One Grand Prix.

With Suzuki also scoring points at the British and Spanish Grands Prix, and Éric Bernard scoring points at Monaco, Britain and Hungary, the team ended the year with 11 points achieving sixth place in the Constructors' Championship.

During the first half of the season, Larrousse was forced to pre-qualify due to only scoring one point in 1989. However, with an improving Lamborghini engine, a chassis considered among the best in the field and two talented young drivers, pre-qualifying was never really a problem and indeed qualifying positions within the top 10 became more and more frequent as the season progressed.

Complete Formula One results
(key)

References

External links 

1990 Formula One season cars
LC90